Nusatupe is an island in the Solomon Islands. It is located in the Western Province, about 2 km from Ghizo Island.

Nusatupe is a populated Island, including  Gizo Air Field personnel, people operating island tourist facilities, and World Fish Headquarters staff.

See also
 

Islands of the Solomon Islands
Western Province (Solomon Islands)